Darzhgi (also Romanized as Darzhgī; also known as Darjgī and Darzhkī) is a village in Isin Rural District, in the Central District of Bandar Abbas County, Hormozgan Province, Iran. At the 2006 census, its population was 44, in 11 families.

References 

Populated places in Bandar Abbas County